Ivan Horvat (born 17 August 1993 in Osijek, Croatia) is a Croatian pole vaulter. He won the silver medal at the 2012 World Junior Athletics Championship in Barcelona. He also competed at the 2012 Summer Olympics where he finished 20th.

Competition record

References

External links

1993 births
Living people
Croatian male pole vaulters
Athletes (track and field) at the 2012 Summer Olympics
Athletes (track and field) at the 2016 Summer Olympics
Olympic athletes of Croatia
Athletes (track and field) at the 2010 Summer Youth Olympics
World Athletics Championships athletes for Croatia
Sportspeople from Osijek